Kaut is a surname of German origin. Notable people with this surname include:

 Ellis Kaut (1920–2015), German author
 Helena Kaut-Howson, British theatre director
 Martin Kaut (born 1999), Czech ice hockey player

See also
 KAUT-TV, television station licensed in Oklahoma, United States

References

Surnames of German origin